Garash is a chocolate cake from the Bulgarian cuisine. It has been created by the Austro-Hungarian Kosta Garash in 1885, in Ruse, Bulgaria. During that time he managed the grand hotel “Islah Hane”, which was located next to the residence of the Bulgarian knyaz Alexander of Battenberg. Guests of the hotel have been royal personas such as Carol I of Romania, Milan I of Serbia and Oscar II. For the occasion of such high-ranking receptions Kosta Garash created his famous "Garash" cake.

Preparation
Five 2 mm-thin round cake plates are made from a batter consisting of 200 g ground walnut kernels, 8 egg whites and 220 g crystal or powdered sugar. After baking and cooling, they are arranged one on top of the other and frosted in between, on top, and on the sides with a frosting (Ganache) made of sweet cream and chocolate. Afterwards, the cake is covered with chocolate icing.

See also
 List of desserts

References

 cake "Garash" recipes

Bulgarian cuisine
Chocolate cakes
Walnut dishes